Ronald Walker (1 January 1926 – 9 February 2011) was an Australian cricketer. He played four first-class cricket matches for Victoria between 1946 and 1947.

See also
 List of Victoria first-class cricketers

References

External links
 

1926 births
2011 deaths
Australian cricketers
Victoria cricketers
Cricketers from Melbourne